Hannah Hofer better known by the mononym Hannah is an Austrian schlager singer. She is signed to Sony Music.

Hannah made a vocal training in rock / pop music at the Powervoice Academy in Hannover and later worked as a vocal coach and a professional singer. In 2011 she released her solo album Es muss aussa in 2011 with some chart success. The follow-up album Weiber, es ist Zeit! in 2013 made it to number 3 in the Austrian Albums chart.

Hannah married in July 2014. She has two children from a previous relationship.

Discography

Albums

References

21st-century Austrian women singers
Living people
Year of birth missing (living people)